The Myasishchev M-60 was a Soviet design for a nuclear-powered bomber.  The design was similar to the M-50 bomber prototype.

Myasishchev received the instruction to start the development of the M-60 on 19 May 1955. However, it did not make it out of the planning stage, and the M-60 program was cancelled in 1959. 

It appears that the M-60 designation has been used for a number of projects at Myasishchev, including a recent transport and civil aircraft.

Specifications (M-60)

See also

References
Notes

Bibliography

1950s Soviet bomber aircraft
Myasishchev aircraft